The Bangladesh Meteorological Department (BMD) also known as Abohawa Office (Weather Office) is the national meteorological organization of Bangladesh, working under Ministry of Defense of the Government of Bangladesh. It is responsible for maintaining the network of surface and upper air observatories, radar and satellite stations, agrometeorological observatories, geomagnetic and seismological observatories and meteorological telecommunication system of Bangladesh.

See also
 Pakistan Meteorological Department

References 

Climate of Bangladesh
Governmental meteorological agencies in Asia